Boron trifluoride is the inorganic compound with the formula  BF3.  This pungent,  colourless, and toxic gas forms white fumes in moist air.  It is a useful Lewis acid and a versatile building block for other boron compounds.

Structure and bonding
The geometry of a  molecule of BF3 is trigonal planar.  Its D3h symmetry conforms with the prediction of VSEPR theory.  The molecule has no dipole moment by virtue of its high symmetry.  The molecule is isoelectronic with the carbonate anion, .

BF3 is commonly referred to as "electron deficient," a description that is reinforced by its exothermic reactivity toward Lewis bases.

In the boron trihalides, BX3, the length of the B–X bonds (1.30 Å) is shorter than would be expected for single bonds, and this shortness may indicate stronger B–X π-bonding in the fluoride.  A facile explanation invokes the symmetry-allowed overlap of a p orbital on the boron atom with the in-phase combination of the three similarly oriented p orbitals on fluorine atoms. Others point to the ionic nature of the bonds in BF3.

Synthesis and handling
BF3 is manufactured by the reaction of boron oxides with hydrogen fluoride:
B2O3  +  6 HF  →  2 BF3  +  3 H2O
Typically the HF is produced in situ from sulfuric acid and fluorite (CaF2). Approximately 2300-4500 tonnes of boron trifluoride are produced every year.

Laboratory scale
For laboratory scale reactions, BF3 is usually produced in situ using boron trifluoride etherate, which is a commercially available liquid.

Laboratory routes to the solvent-free materials are numerous.  A well documented route involves the thermal decomposition of diazonium salts of :
PhN2BF4  →  PhF  +  BF3  +  N2

Alternatively it arises from the reaction of sodium tetrafluoroborate, boron trioxide, and sulfuric acid:
6 NaBF4 + B2O3 + 6 H2SO4 → 8 BF3 + 6 NaHSO4 + 3 H2O

Properties
Anhydrous boron trifluoride has a boiling point of −100.3 °C and a critical temperature of −12.3 °C, so that it can be stored as a refrigerated liquid only between those temperatures. Storage or transport vessels should be designed to withstand internal pressure, since a refrigeration system failure could cause pressures to rise to the critical pressure of 49.85 bar (4.985 MPa).

Boron trifluoride is corrosive. Suitable metals for equipment handling boron trifluoride include stainless steel, monel, and hastelloy. In presence of moisture it corrodes steel, including stainless steel. It reacts with polyamides.  Polytetrafluoroethylene, polychlorotrifluoroethylene, polyvinylidene fluoride, and polypropylene show satisfactory resistance. The grease used in the equipment should be fluorocarbon based, as boron trifluoride reacts with the hydrocarbon-based ones.

Reactions
Unlike the aluminium and gallium trihalides, the boron trihalides are all monomeric.  They undergo rapid halide exchange reactions:
BF3  +  BCl3  →  BF2Cl  +  BCl2F
Because of the facility of this exchange process, the mixed halides cannot be obtained in pure form.

Boron trifluoride is a versatile Lewis acid that forms adducts with such Lewis bases as fluoride and ethers:
CsF  +  BF3  →  CsBF4
O(C2H5)2  +  BF3  →  BF3·O(C2H5)2

Tetrafluoroborate salts are commonly employed as non-coordinating anions.  The adduct with diethyl ether, boron trifluoride diethyl etherate, or just boron trifluoride etherate, (BF3·O(Et)2) is a conveniently handled liquid and consequently is widely encountered as a laboratory source of BF3. Another common adduct is the adduct with dimethyl sulfide (BF3·S(Me)2), which can be handled as a neat liquid.

Comparative Lewis acidity
All three lighter boron trihalides, BX3 (X = F, Cl, Br) form stable adducts with common Lewis bases.  Their relative Lewis acidities can be evaluated in terms of the relative exothermicities of the adduct-forming reaction. Such measurements have revealed the following sequence for the Lewis acidity:

BF3 < BCl3 < BBr3 < BI3(strongest Lewis acid)

This trend is commonly attributed to the degree of π-bonding in the planar boron trihalide that would be lost upon pyramidalization of the BX3 molecule. which follows this trend:

BF3 > BCl3 > BBr3 < BI3 (most easily pyramidalized)

The criteria for evaluating the relative strength of π-bonding are not clear, however. One suggestion is that the F atom is small compared to the larger Cl and Br atoms, and the lone pair electron in pz of F is readily and easily donated and overlapped to empty pz orbital of boron. As a result, the pi donation of F is greater than that of Cl or Br.

In an alternative explanation, the low Lewis acidity for BF3 is attributed to the relative weakness of the bond in the adducts F3B−L.

Hydrolysis
Boron trifluoride reacts with water to give boric acid and fluoroboric acid. The reaction commences with the formation of the aquo adduct, H2O−BF3, which then loses HF that gives fluoroboric acid with boron trifluoride.

4 BF3  +  3 H2O  →  3 HBF4  +  B(OH)3

Because of the high acidity of fluoroboric acid, the fluoroborate ion can be used to isolate particularly electrophilic cations, such as diazonium ions, that are otherwise difficult to isolate as solids.

Uses

Organic chemistry
Boron trifluoride is most importantly used as a reagent in organic synthesis, typically as a Lewis acid. Examples include:
 initiates polymerisation reactions of unsaturated compounds, such as polyethers
 as a catalyst in some isomerization, acylation, alkylation, esterification, dehydration, condensation, Mukaiyama aldol addition, and other reactions

Niche uses
Other, less common uses for boron trifluoride include:
 applied as dopant in ion implantation
 p-type dopant for epitaxially grown silicon
 used in sensitive neutron detectors in ionization chambers and devices to monitor radiation levels in the Earth's atmosphere
 in fumigation
 as a flux for soldering magnesium
 to prepare diborane

Discovery
Boron trifluoride was discovered in 1808 by Joseph Louis Gay-Lussac and Louis Jacques Thénard, who were trying to isolate "fluoric acid" (i.e., hydrofluoric acid) by combining calcium fluoride with vitrified boric acid.  The resulting vapours failed to etch glass, so they named it fluoboric gas.

See also
List of highly toxic gases

References

External links
 
  
 
 
 
 

Fluorides
Boron compounds
Boron halides
Industrial gases
Acid catalysts